Exoletuncus trilobopus is a species of moth of the family Tortricidae. It is found in Rio Grande do Sul, Brazil.

The wingspan is 24 mm. The ground colour of the forewings has a slight yellowish-olive hue with a black pattern, consisting of rather small blotches. The hindwings are brownish cream, suffused and spotted with brown.

References

Moths described in 1926
Euliini